The Carnahan House, in Boyce, Louisiana, was built around 1880 and was added to the National Register of Historic Places in 1995.

It is a one-and-a-half-story frame galleried cottage built in a transitional Greek Revival/Italianate style.  It was remodeled around 1900 by the addition of an Eastlake-style gallery.

It is located near the Red River levee.

References

Houses on the National Register of Historic Places in Louisiana
Queen Anne architecture in Louisiana
Italianate architecture in Louisiana
Houses completed in 1880
Houses in Rapides Parish, Louisiana
National Register of Historic Places in Rapides Parish, Louisiana